Aathara Stalam indicates the places which are considered to be divine impersonations of Tantric chakras, associated with human anatomy. The Annamalaiyar temple is called the Manipooraga stalam, associated with "Manipooraga", the human anatomical cause for spiritual ignorance, thirst, jealousy, treachery, shame, fear, disgust, delusion, foolishness and sadness. Five temples are located in Tamil Nadu, and one at Varanasi.

References 

Shiva temples